Klinika za plućne bolesti (Department of Pulmonary Diseases) is a hospital specializing in lung diseases such as tuberculosis, lung cancer, bronchitis, etc. It was opened in 1953 in the Slavinovići neighborhood of Tuzla, Bosnia and Herzegovina. The hospital was renovated in 2006.

After 57 years, the hospital finally had heating installed in autumn 2010.

References

Hospitals established in 1953
Hospitals in Bosnia and Herzegovina

Buildings and structures in Tuzla